Decoding Genius was a six-part podcast series investigating the stories of six young geniuses changing the world in their respective fields. It was hosted by Australian mathematician Lily Serna, and also featured experts in intelligence. The series was produced by MADE, in collaboration with Macquarie Media for Fairfax and GE. It launched on 26 October, 2016.

Reception 
Decoding Genius secured over 142,000 downloads. In the first week of launch, it was ranked in the Apple Store’s top 10 podcasts. It was also the #1 podcast in the iTunes Arts category during its release. 

The series won an INMA (International News Media Association) Global Media Award.

The Australian Audio Guide described the series as being "bright-sounding and snappily produced".

Episodes

Decoding Industry 
In April 2017, a spinoff live event was hosted, focusing on digital disruption, future skills, and how Australia must leverage technology for future prosperity. A podcast series was released in June 2017, with several episodes created from the live event.

References

External links 

 Decoding Genius on Apple Podcasts
 Decoding Genius on Whooshkaa

2016 podcast debuts
Educational podcasts
Audio podcasts
Australian podcasts